Shahid Alikhani Metro Station is a station on Isfahan Metro Line 1. The station opened on 15 October 2015. It is located at Shahid Alikhani Sq., formerly known as Malekshahr Sq., at Malekshahr in northern Isfahan. The next station on the west side is Shahid Mofateh Station and on the southeast side Jaber Station.

References

Isfahan Metro stations
Railway stations opened in 2015